The following is the list of squads that took place in the men's field hockey tournament at the 1968 Summer Olympics.

Group A

Belgium
The following players represented Belgium:

 Jean-Marie Buisset
 André Muschs
 Marc Legros
 Georges Vanderhulst
 Jean-Louis le Clerc
 Yves Bernaert
 Michel Deville
 Claude Ravinet
 Guy Miserque
 Jean-Louis Roersch
 Jean-François Gilles
 Daniel Dupont
 Armand Solie
 William Hansen
 Charly Bouvy

East Germany
The following players represented East Germany:

 Rainer Stephan
 Axel Thieme
 Eckhard Wallossek
 Klaus Bahner
 Horst Brennecke
 Dieter Klauß
 Lothar Lippert
 Dieter Ehrlich
 Karl-Heinz Freiberger
 Reinhart Sasse
 Hans-Dietrich Sasse
 Rolf Thieme
 Klaus Träumer
 Helmut Rabis

India
The following players represented India:

 Rajendra Christy
 Krishnamurty Perumal
 John "V.J." Peter
 Inam-ur Rahman
 Munir Sait
 Ajitpal Singh
 Balbir Singh Kullar
 Balbir Singh Kular
 Balbir Singh
 Gurbux Singh
 Harbinder Singh
 Harmik Singh
 Inder "Gogi" Singh
 Prithipal Singh
 Tarsem Singh
 Jagjit Singh

Japan
The following players represented Japan:

 Norihiko Matsumoto
 Katsuhiro Yuzaki
 Akio Takashima
 Shigeo Kaoku
 Tsuneya Yuzaki
 Akio Kudo
 Kyoichi Nagaya
 Hiroshi Tanaka
 Shozo Nishimura
 Masashi Onda
 Minoru Yoshimura
 Akihito Wada
 Yukio Kamimura
 Kazuo Kawamura

Mexico
The following players represented Mexico:

 José Antonio Prud'homme
 David Sevilla
 Javier Varela
 Adrian Maycsell
 Zeno Fernández
 Orlando Ventura
 Héctor Bustamante
 Héctor Ventura
 Oscar Huacuja
 Juan Calderón
 Humberto Gutiérrez
 Robert Villaseñor
 Enrique Filoteo
 Jorge Bada
 Manuel Fernández
 Noel Gutiérrez
 Adán Noriega

New Zealand
The following players represented New Zealand:

 John Anslow
 Jan Borren
 Roger Capey
 John Christensen
 John Hicks
 Bruce Judge
 Alan McIntyre
 Ross McPherson
 Barry Maister
 Selwyn Maister
 Alan Patterson
 Ted Salmon
 Keith Thomson

Spain
The following players represented Spain:

 Carlos del Coso
 Antonio Nogués
 Julio Solaun
 José Sallés
 José Antonio Dinarés
 Narciso Ventalló
 Agustín Masaña
 Juan Quintana
 Francisco Amat
 Jorge Fábregas
 Jorge Vidal
 José Colomer
 Juan Amat
 Francisco Fábregas
 Juan José Alvear
 Rafael Camiña
 Pedro Amat

West Germany
The following players represented West Germany:

 Wolfgang Rott
 Günther Krauss
 Utz Aichinger
 Jürgen Wein
 Klaus Greinert
 Uli Vos
 Detlev Kittstein
 Norbert Schuler
 Fritz Schmidt
 Carsten Keller
 Michael Krause
 Wolfgang Müller
 Dirk Michel
 Eckardt Suhl
 Ulrich Sloma
 Hermann End
 Friedrich Josten
 Wolfgang Baumgart

Group B

Argentina
The following players represented Argentina:

 Eduardo Guelfand
 Armando Cicognini
 Jorge Piccioli
 Osvaldo Monti
 Fernando Calp
 Jorge Tanuscio
 Eduardo Anderson
 Héctor Marinoni
 Gerardo Lorenzo
 Alberto Disera
 Rodolfo Monti
 Jorge Sabbione
 Gabriel Scally
 Daniel Portugués
 Alfredo Quaquarini
 Jorge Giannini
 Carlos Kenny
 Jorge Suárez

Australia
The following players represented Australia:

 Paul Dearing
 Raymond Evans
 Brian Glencross
 Robert Haigh
 Donald Martin
 James Mason
 Patrick Nilan
 Eric Pearce
 Gordon Pearce
 Julian Pearce
 Desmond Piper
 Fred Quine
 Ronald Riley
 Donald Smart
 Arthur Busch

France
The following players represented France:

 Jean-Paul Sauthier
 Jean-Claude Merkes
 Patrick Burtschell
 Gilles Verrier
 Marc Chapon
 Georges Corbel
 Claude Windal
 Stéphane Joinau
 Charles Pous
 Richard Dodrieux
 Jean-Paul Capelle
 Philippe Vignon
 Georges Grain
 Alain Pascarel
 Albert Vanpoulle
 Bernard Arlin
 Jean-Paul Petit
 Michel Windal

Great Britain
The following players represented Great Britain:

 Harry Cahill
 Roger Flood
 John Neill
 Jim Deegan
 Richard Oliver
 David Wilman
 Gerald Carr
 Tony Ekins
 Keith Sinclair
 Andrew Trentham
 Jeremy Barham
 Basil Christensen
 Charles Donald
 Timothy Lawson
 Stuart Morris
 Malcolm Read
 Colin Whalley
 Peter Wilson

Kenya
The following players represented Kenya:

 John Simonian
 Kirpal Singh Bhardwaj
 Avtar Singh Sohal
 Mohamed Ajmal Malik
 Surjeet Singh Panesar
 Silvester Fernandes
 Leo Fernandes
 Hilary Fernandes
 Davinder Singh Deegan
 Santokh Singh Matharu
 Alu Mendonca
 Harvinder Singh Marwa
 Egbert Fernandes
 Renny Pereira

Malaysia
The following players represented Malaysia:

 Ho Koh Chye
 Francis Belavantheran
 Sri Shanmuganathan
 Michael Arulraj
 Kunaratnam Alagaratnam
 Ameen-ud-Din bin Mohamed Ibrahim
 Joseph Johnson
 Savinder Singh
 Arumugam Sabapathy
 Yang Siow Ming
 Koh Hock Seng
 Harnahal Singh Sewa
 Koh Chong Jin
 Shamuganathan Jeevajothy
 Rajaratnam Yogeswaran
 Kuldip Singh Uijeer
 Loong Whey Pyu

Netherlands
The following players represented the Netherlands:

 Joost Boks
 Aart Brederode
 Edo Buma
 Sebo Ebbens
 John Elffers
 Jan Piet Fokker
 Otto ter Haar
 Gerard Hijlkema
 Arie de Keyzer
 Ewald Kist
 Tippy de Lanoy Meijer
 Frans Spits
 Heiko van Staveren
 Theo Terlingen
 Kik Thole
 Theo van Vroonhoven
 Piet Weemers

Pakistan
The following players represented Pakistan:

 Abdul Rashid
 Jahangir Butt
 Tanvir Dar
 Gulraiz Akhtar
 Khalid Mahmood
 Muhammad Asad Malik 
 Muhammad Ashfaq Ahmed
 Tariq Niazi
 Riaz Ahmed
 Riaz ud-Din
 Saeed Anwar
 Tariq Aziz
 Zakir Hussain

References

1968

Squads